Peoples Choice: Favorite Canadian Video is an award presented at the MuchMusic Video Awards. The award was not presented after the 2000 MuchMusic Video Awards until the 2009 ceremony. During that period, the award show presented the awards for Peoples Choice: Favourite Canadian Group and Peoples Choice: Favourite Canadian Artist.

Winners

MuchMusic Video Awards